Canada competed at the 2020 Summer Olympics in Tokyo. Originally scheduled to take place from 24 July to 9 August 2020, the Games were postponed to 23 July to 8 August 2021, because of the COVID-19 pandemic. Since the nation's debut in 1900, Canadian athletes have appeared in every edition of the Summer Olympic Games, with the exception of the 1980 Summer Olympics in Moscow because of the country's support for United States-led boycott.

Before the official postponement, the Canadian Olympic Committee and Canadian Paralympic Committee initially announced their intention not to send teams to both the Olympics and Paralympics. Following the announcement on the postponement, the COC and CPC issued a statement that says, in part, that Team Canada "will rise to the challenge to showcase our very best on the international stage," without explicitly saying that Canadian athletes will take part in the games.

As part of the Canada Day celebrations held on Parliament Hill, Ottawa in 2019, former three time Olympic gold medalist in rowing, Marnie McBean was named as the Chef De Mission for the team.

On July 13, 2021, the Canadian Olympic Committee officially announced the full team of 370 athletes (145 men and 225 women) competing in 30 sports, the largest team the country has sent to the games since Los Angeles 1984 and an increase of 56 from Rio 2016. 131 coaches will also accompany the team. A total of eight squads qualified in team sports, tied for the most ever with Montreal 1976. A total of 227 athletes competed at their first Olympics, and 134 of them returned from Rio 2016. On July 15, 2021, Vasek Pospisil withdrew from the tennis competitions, which reduced the team size to 370. On July 24, Annie Guglia received a reallocated spot in the women's street skateboarding event after an injury to a competitor from South Africa. This increased the team back to 371 athletes (145 men and 226 women).

Due to the effects of the COVID-19 pandemic, the International Olympic Committee announced in July 2021, that travelling alternates would be allowed to compete in the following team sports: field hockey, football (soccer), handball, rugby sevens and water polo. The alternates for these team sports are listed below and consisted of a further nine athletes (two in field hockey, four in soccer, one per rugby sevens and water polo teams). However, these nine do not officially count towards the team size. Canada's Olympic team contested all sports on the Olympic program except handball, modern pentathlon and surfing. Alternates in soccer, rugby sevens and water polo competed, and are reflected in the table below. This increased the team size to 378. Two athletes in fencing and one in triathlon was added during the competition due to injury replacements. This meant the final team size was 381 athletes (148 men and 233 women).

On July 19, 2021, basketball player Miranda Ayim and rugby sevens athlete Nathan Hirayama were named as co-flagbearers for the Parade of Nations during the opening ceremony. On August 8, 2021, gold medalist and Olympic record holder in the decathlon, Damian Warner was named as the flagbearer during the closing ceremony.

The 24 medals won at the 2020 Summer Olympics mark the country's best-ever total medals result after the 1984 Games, surpassing the 22 medals won in 1996 and 2016, while also equalling the most number of gold medals won in 1992. At the 1984 Summer Olympics, which were boycotted by the Soviet Bloc, Canada won 44 medals.

Medallists

|width="78%" align="left" valign="top"|

 Canada finished third in the Men's 4 x 100 metres relay. On 18 February 2022 team of Great Britain was disqualified from the Athletics Men's 4 × 100 metres relay due to a doping violation and officially stripped of the silver medal. Canada will be elevated to the silver medal, while China will receive bronze. Medals have not yet been reallocated.

|width="22%" align="left" valign="top"|

Competitors
The following is the list of athletes per sport/discipline.

Archery

Canada qualified one archer for the men's individual recurve, after Crispin Duenas won the individual gold medal at the 2019 Pan American Games in Lima, Peru. In March 2021, Stephanie Barrett claimed one of three available quota places in the women's individual recurve, at the 2021 Pan American Qualification Tournament in Monterrey, Mexico. Barrett was officially nominated to the team on May 12, 2021. The team was officially named on June 28, 2021.

Artistic swimming

Canada is scheduled to enter a team of eight artistic swimmers to compete in the women's duet and team event. The team qualified by winning the gold medal in the team event at the 2019 Pan American Games in Lima, Peru. The team was officially named on June 2, 2021.

Athletics

Canadian athletes achieved the entry standards, either by qualifying time or by world ranking, in the following track and field events (up to a maximum of 3 athletes in each event): The team will be selected based on the results of the 2020 Canadian Olympic Track & Field Trials.

On May 5, 2020, 2019 world bronze medalist Evan Dunfee, along with marathoners Trevor Hofbauer and Dayna Pidhoresky, became the first Canadian track and field athletes to be selected to the Tokyo 2020 team. On June 4, 2021, Athletics Canada named the 10,000 metres, 50 km race walk and the rest of the marathon team. The final team of 57 athletes (24 men and 33 women) was named on July 3, 2021. Bolade Ajomale and Lauren Gale named to the men's 4x100 relay and women's 4x400 relay teams respectively, did not compete in the heats or the final.

Track & road events
Men

Women

Field events
Men

Women

Combined events – Men's decathlon

Combined events – Women's heptathlon

Badminton

Canada entered eight badminton players (four per gender) for the following events based on the BWF Race to Tokyo Rankings of 15 June 2021: one entry each in the men's and women's singles; and a pair each in the men's, women's, and mixed doubles. The eight qualified athletes represents the largest badminton team Canada has sent to the Olympics, and marks the first time since Sydney 2000 the country will compete in all five events. The team was officially named on June 16, 2021.

Basketball

Summary

Women's tournament

Canada women's basketball team qualified for the Olympics as one of two highest-ranked eligible teams at the Ostend event of the 2020 FIBA Women's Olympic Qualifying Tournament.

Team roster

Group A

Boxing

Canada qualified five boxers, one man and four women. With the cancellation of the 2021 Pan American Qualification Tournament in Buenos Aires, Caroline Veyre (women's featherweight), Myriam Da Silva (women's welterweight), and Tammara Thibeault (women's middleweight) finished among the top three of their respective weight divisions in the IOC's Boxing Task Force Rankings for the Americas. On June 9, 2021, Wyatt Sanford earned a spot on the team, as the highest ranked boxer from the Americas not already qualified.

On June 30, 2021, Mandy Bujold won her appeal at the Court of Arbitration for Sport to compete at the Games. The court ruled that the qualification system must accommodate pregnant or postpartum women during the qualification period. The full team of five athletes was officially named to the team on July 7, 2021.

Canoeing

Canada qualified a total of 20 canoeists. Four qualified in slalom (two per gender, the maximum team size). A further 16 qualified in sprint (eight men and eight women).

Slalom
Canadian canoeists qualified three boats through the 2019 ICF Canoe Slalom World Championships in La Seu d'Urgell, Spain. With the cancellation of the 2021 Pan American Championships, Canada accepted the invitation from the ICF to send a canoeist in the women's slalom C-1 to the Games, as the highest-ranked eligible nation from the Americas. The team was officially named on June 3, 2021. For the first time since Sydney 2000, Canada qualified entries all events.

Sprint
Canada qualified three boats and nine athlete spots (four each in men's and women's kayak, and one in women's canoe) at the 2019 ICF Canoe Sprint World Championships in Szeged, Hungary. In March 2021, the Pan American sprint qualifier that was scheduled to be held in Curitiba, Brazil was cancelled due to concerns over the COVID-19 pandemic. Due to the cancellation, the International Canoe Federation announced that Canada had been allocated an additional two quotas in each of men's kayak and canoe, along with an additional quota in women's kayak. This meant the team stood at a total of six men's kayakers and two canoeists, along with five women's kayakers and one canoeist (for a total of 14 athletes).

In March 2021, Canoe Kayak Canada selected the C-1 and K-4 women's boats based on performances at the trials. In May 2021, Canoe Kayak Canada named the men's kayak and canoe teams. The final team of 16 athletes (eight per gender) was officially named on July 7, 2021. In the team announcement, a further kayak and canoe quotas was awarded to Canada in the women's events.

Men

Women

Cycling

Canada qualified a total of 24 cyclists (11 men and 13 women), the largest cycling team the county has ever qualified for the games. This is broken down further into five in road, 13 in track, three in mountain biking and two in BMX racing.

Road
Canada entered a team of six road cyclists (three per gender). The men qualified three athletes by finishing 20th in the UCI Nation Ranking, while the women qualified two competitors, by finishing in eighth.

On July 29, 2020, cyclists Hugo Houle, Michael Woods, Karol-Ann Canuel, and Leah Kirchmann were officially named to the Canadian roster for their second consecutive Games. The final cyclist named to the team was Guillaume Boivin on July 6, 2021. On July 13, 2021, it was announced that a third women's quota was reallocated to Canada. This quota was given to Allison Jackson for the road race event.

Men

Women

Track
Following the completion of the 2020 UCI Track Cycling World Championships, Canadian riders accumulated spots for both men and women in the team pursuit and madison, as well as the women's omnium, based on their country's results in the final UCI Olympic rankings. Canada also entered cyclists to compete each in the men's and women's sprint, as well as the men's and women's keirin, based on the final individual UCI Olympic rankings. Cycling Canada later decided to not enter a team in the women's madison, due to a lack of competition experience in the event, coupled with the fact it would take place before the omnimum.

The full Canadian track team of 13 cyclists (six men and seven women) was officially named on July 29, 2020, featuring Rio 2016 bronze medallists Allison Beveridge, Jasmin Duehring, and Georgia Simmerling in the women's team pursuit and Vincent De Haître, a speed skater and two-time Winter Olympian slated to compete at his first summer Games.

Sprint

Pursuit

Keirin

Omnium

Madison

Mountain biking
Canadian mountain bikers qualified for one men's and two women's quota places as a result of the nation's tenth-place finish for men and fourth for women, respectively, in the UCI Olympic Ranking List of 16 May 2021. The team was named on July 6, 2021.

BMX
Canadian riders qualified one men's and one women's quota place each as a result of the nation's top three eligible placement for men in the UCI BMX Individual Ranking List, and an eleventh-place finish for women in the UCI BMX Olympic Qualification Ranking List of 1 June 2021. The team was named on July 6, 2021.

Diving

Canadian divers qualified for the following individual spots and synchronized teams through the 2019 FINA World Championships in Gwangju, South Korea and the 2021 FINA Diving World Cup in Tokyo. The synchronized diving teams that qualified, were automatically named to the team. The individual spots were awarded at the Canadian Diving Trials held in Toronto from June 28 to July 1, 2021. A total of 10 divers (four men and six women) qualified to compete.

Men

Women

Equestrian

Canada qualified a team of six equestrians. Canadian equestrians qualified a full team in team dressage competition through the 2019 Pan American Games in Lima, Peru. Meanwhile, two eventing spots were awarded to the Canadian equestrians based on the results in the individual FEI Olympic rankings for Group E (North America and Caribbean).

On 17 December 2019, the show jumping team was officially dropped from the Games over a positive drug test by rider Nicole Walker for cocaine; hence, one individual jumping spot was awarded to the Canadian equestrians by securing the last of four available quotas at the Pan American Games.

The full team, consisted of two men and four women, was named on July 6, 2021.

Dressage

Qualification Legend: Q =Qualified for the final; q =Qualified for the final as a lucky loser

Eventing

Jessica Phoenix withdrew Pavarotti before the first trot-up prior to the start of the eventing competition.

Jumping

Fencing

Canada's fencing team consisted of nine athletes (five men and four women), the largest delegation in the sport since Beijing 2008. For the first time since Seoul 1988, Canadian fencers qualified a full team each in the men's and women's team foil at the Games, as the highest-ranked nation from the Americas outside the world's top four in the FIE Olympic Team Rankings. Shaul Gordon (men's sabre) and Gabriella Page (women's sabre) secured additional spots on the Canadian team as one of the two highest-ranked fencers vying for qualification from the Americas region in their respective individual events of the FIE Adjusted Official Rankings. Meanwhile, Marc-Antoine Blais-Belanger completed the Canadian roster by winning the individual men's épée competition at the Pan American Zonal Qualifier in San José, Costa Rica. The official team was named on May 20, 2021. Both substitutes for the team events, Blake Broszus and Kelleigh Ryan came on in the team event, which increased the team size to eleven athletes (six men and five women).

Men

Broszus replaced Schenkel during the team competition.

Women

Goldie replaced Ryan during the team competition.

Field hockey

Summary

Men's tournament

Canada men's field hockey team qualified by securing one of the seven quotas available as part of the 2019 FIH Olympic Qualifiers. The team defeated Ireland in a two-legged playoff in Vancouver.

Team roster

Group B

Football (soccer)

Summary

Women's tournament

Canada women's football team qualified for the Olympics by reaching the finals of the 2020 CONCACAF Women's Olympic Qualifying Championship in Carson, California. The team went onto win the gold medal, marking the first women's team sport gold medal earned by the country ever, and the first overall since 1908.

Team roster
The final squad of 18 athletes and four alternates was announced on June 23, 2021. Those listed with numbers 19 to 22 were the alternates.

Group E

Quarterfinals

Semifinals

Gold medal match

Golf

Canada entered four golfers, two per gender. All four golfers qualified directly among the top 60 eligible players for their respective events. The team was officially named on June 29, 2021.

Gymnastics

Artistic
Canada qualified a team of five artistic gymnasts (one man and four women). The women's team secured a place by finishing second out of nine nations eligible for qualification in the team all-around at the 2019 World Artistic Gymnastics Championships in Stuttgart, Germany. Meanwhile, an additional berth was awarded to one male gymnast, after René Cournoyer received a quota for being the highest non-qualified gymnast through reallocation. The team was officially named on June 17, 2021.

Men

Women
Team

Individual

Trampoline
Canada qualified one gymnast for the women's trampoline by finishing in the top eight at the 2019 World Championships in Tokyo, Japan. Samantha Smith qualified an additional spot through the 2019-2020 Trampoline World Cup series.

Judo

Canada qualified six judoka (three per gender). Five of them, highlighted by London 2012 bronze medalist Antoine Valois-Fortier (men's half-middleweight, 81 kg), were ranked among the top 18 eligible judokas in the IJF World Ranking List of June 28, 2021, while Ecaterina Guica in the women's half-lightweight (52 kg) earned a continental quota spot from the Pan American region as Canada's top-ranked judoka outside of a direct qualifying position. Kelita Zupancic was set to compete, but eventually withdrew and retired because of her pregnancy. The team was officially named on June 30, 2021.

Both Margelidon and Valois-Fortier received byes in the preliminary round.

Karate

Canada qualified one male karateka after Daniel Gaysinsky finished in the top three at the 2021 Karate World Olympic Qualification Tournament in Paris, France. With the sport making its first appearance at the Games, this will also mark Canada's Olympic sport debut. Gaysinsky was officially named to the team on July 5, 2021. Gaysinsky would go onto finish in seventh place (out of ten competitors) after winning and drawing one match, while losing two in the group stage. Gaysinsky did not advance to the semifinals.

Rowing

Canada qualified ten boats (29 rowers) for each of the following rowing classes. Six of them were awarded at the 2019 FISA World Championships in Ottensheim, Austria, with the other three obtaining the available slots in the men's single sculls, men's four, and men's lightweight double sculls at the 2021 FISA Final Qualification Regatta in Lucerne, Switzerland.

The women's lightweight double sculls boat qualification was awarded to the Canadian rowing team through its eighth-place finish at the 2019 Worlds, after New Zealand declined its quota place.

On June 15, 2021, the crews for the 10 boat classes (29 rowers) were named, with this being the most boat classes team Canada has qualified for the Olympics since 1996, and the largest contingent of athletes since the 2012 games.

Men

Women

Rugby sevens

Summary

Men's tournament

Canada national rugby sevens team qualified by winning the 2019 RAN Sevens tournament in George Town, Cayman Islands.

Team roster	
Canada's roster of 12 athletes and one alternate was named on June 25, 2021.

Head coach: Henry Paul

Phil Berna
Connor Braid
Andrew Coe (alternate)
Justin Douglas 
Mike Fuailefau
Lucas Hammond 
Nathan Hirayama (C)
Harry Jones (C)
Patrick Kay 
Matt Mullins
Theo Sauder
Jake Thiel
Conor Trainor

Group B

Quarterfinals 

5–8th place playoff

7th place match

Women's tournament

Canada women's national rugby sevens team qualified by securing one of the top four spots during the 2018–19 World Rugby Women's Sevens Series.

Team roster
Canada's roster of 12 athletes and one alternate was named on June 25, 2021.

Head coach: Mick Byrne

Elissa Alarie
Olivia Apps (alternate)
Britt Benn
Pamphinette Buisa 
Bianca Farella
Julia Greenshields 
Ghislaine Landry (c)
Kaili Lukan 
Kayla Moleschi 
Breanne Nicholas
Karen Paquin
Keyara Wardley
Charity Williams

Group B

Ninth to twelfth place playoff

Ninth place match

Sailing

Canadian sailors qualified one boat in each of the following events through the 2018 Sailing World Championships, the class-associated Worlds, the 2019 Pan American Games, and the continental regattas.

The full Canadian sailing team (five men and women) was officially named on March 18, 2021, with Nikola Girke becoming the first female sailor for her country to compete in five consecutive Games.

Men

Women

M =Medal race; EL =Eliminated – did not advance into the medal race

Shooting

Canada qualified one shooter through the 2018 Championships of the Americas in Guadalajara, Mexico. The athlete named to the team must have obtained a minimum qualifying score (MQS). The Shooting Federation of Canada named the only athletes qualified to compete on April 30, 2021. Lynda Kiejko will be competing in her second straight Olympics.

Women

Skateboarding

Canada qualified a total of four skateboarders (three men and one woman). One skateboarder qualified in the men's park event, based on the Olympic World Skateboarding Rankings. Canada later qualified two men in the street discipline, also based on the Olympic World Skateboarding Rankings. The team was officially named on June 11, 2021. With the debut of Skateboarding on the Olympic program, this also marks Canada's sport debut at the Olympics. On July 24, Annie Guglia received a reallocated spot in the women's street skateboarding event after an injury to a competitor from South Africa.

Softball

Canada women's national softball team qualified by placing second at the WSBC American Qualification Event, held in Surrey, British Columbia.

Summary

Team roster

Group play

Bronze medal match

Sport climbing

Canada qualified two sport climbers. Sean McColl secured one of the quota places available in the men's combined event at the 2019 IFSC World Championships in Hachioji, Japan. Meanwhile, Alannah Yip claimed a spot with her win at the IFSC Pan American Championships in Los Angeles, California. The team was officially named on March 19, 2021.

Swimming

The Canadian swim team consisted of 26 swimmers (10 men and 16 women). Canadian swimmers achieved qualifying standards in the following events (up to a maximum of 2 swimmers in each event at the Olympic Qualifying Time (OQT), and potentially 1 at the Olympic Selection Time (OST)): To secure their nomination to the Olympic team, swimmers must have finished in the top two of each individual pool event under the FINA Olympic qualifying A standard at the Canadian Olympic Trials (19 to 23 June 2021) in Toronto, Ontario. Swimmers not meeting the standard were named as relay only swimmers.

At the 2020 Olympic Marathon Swim Qualifier in Setúbal, Portugal, Kate Sanderson qualified for the games with a third place finish. The next day, Hau-Li Fan qualified as the highest finisher from the Americas not yet qualified.

On January 22, 2021, Swimming Canada nominated six swimmers to the Olympic team, including Penny Oleksiak (women's 200 m freestyle); and world champions Kylie Masse (women's 100 m backstroke) and Maggie MacNeil (women's 100 m butterfly). These swimmers were named based on their performances at the 2019 World Aquatics Championships in Gwangju, South Korea. The rest of the team was named on June 24, 2021.

Men

Women

Mixed

 Swimmers who participated in the heats only.

Table tennis
 
Canada qualified three athletes into the table tennis competition. Eugene Wang secured a men's spot for his third Olympics, with Zhang Mo going to her fourth in the women's side, by winning the singles competition at the 2020 ITTF North American Olympic Qualification Tournament in Kitchener, Ontario, Canada. The duo also won the inaugural mixed doubles competition to qualify for that event. Wang later gave up his singles spot in favour of Jeremy Hazin to focus on the mixed doubles.

Taekwondo

Canada qualified two taekwondo practitioners. Skylar Park qualified directly for the women's lightweight category (57 kg) by finishing among the top five in the World Taekwondo Olympic Rankings at the end of the qualification period. In late June 2021, Yvette Yong was allocated an unused quota spot from the 2020 Oceania Qualification Tournament, bringing the team to two athletes. The team was officially named on July 2, 2021.

Women

Tennis

Canada qualified five tennis players (two men and three women). Milos Raonic and Denis Shapovalov were also listed in the rankings but declined the opportunity to attend the Games. The team was officially named on June 29, 2021. On July 12, 2021, Bianca Andreescu withdrew from the tournament citing the effects of the Covid-19 pandemic, which meant the team was reduced to five athletes. The team was further reduced to four athletes when Vasek Pospisil withdrew.

Triathlon

Canada qualified four triathletes (two per gender) based on the ITU Olympic Rankings as of June 14, 2021. The team was officially named on July 7, 2021. Alexis Lepage was added to the team to replace Tyler Mislawchuk in the mixed relay, after Mislawchuk was injured in the individual race.

Individual

Mixed relay

Volleyball

Canada qualified a total of 16 athletes in volleyball. 12 of the 16 made up the men's volleyball team, while the other four consisted of two pairs in the women's beach volleyball tournament.

Beach

Melissa Humana-Paredes and Sarah Pavan qualified by winning the gold medal at the 2019 FIVB World Championships in Hamburg, Germany. Heather Bansley and Brandie Wilkerson later qualified by being ranked in the top 15 of the FIVB Beach volleyball Olympic Ranking. The team was officially named on July 5, 2021.

Indoor
Summary

Men's tournament

Canada men's volleyball team qualified by winning the North American Olympic Qualification Tournament in Vancouver.

Team roster

Group A

Quarterfinal

Water polo

Summary

Women's tournament

Canada women's national water polo team qualified for the Olympics by winning the silver medal, and securing a berth as the highest ranked non-qualified team, at the 2019 Pan American Games in Lima, Peru, signifying the country's return to the competition for the first time since Athens 2004.

Team roster

Group A

Quarterfinal

5–8th place semifinal

Seventh place game

Weightlifting

Canada qualified five weightlifters, one man and four women. Both Boady Santavy (96 kg) and Maude Charron (64 kg) qualified by being ranked in the top eight of their respective weight categories in the IWF absolute rankings. The remaining three weightlifters topped the field among those vying for qualification from the Pan American region. The team was officially named on June 18, 2021.

Wrestling

Canada qualified four wrestlers for each of the following weight classes; all of whom advanced to the finals to book spots in the men's freestyle (97 and 125 kg) and women's freestyle (68 and 76 kg), respectively, at the 2020 Pan American Qualification Tournament in Ottawa. These will be the first Olympics where Canada has failed to qualify entries in all women's freestyle weight categories. The team was officially confirmed on May 19, 2021.

Freestyle

See also
Canada at the 2018 Commonwealth Games
Canada at the 2019 Pan American Games
Canada at the 2020 Winter Youth Olympics
Canada at the 2020 Summer Paralympics

References

Nations at the 2020 Summer Olympics
2020
2021 in Canadian sports
Impact of the COVID-19 pandemic on the 2020 Summer Olympics